The 1913 Akron Indians season was their sixth season in existence. The team played in the Ohio League and posted an 11–1 record to win their third state title.

Schedule

Game notes

References
 
 Pro Football Archives: Akron Indians 1913

Akron Pros seasons
Akron Pros
Akron Pros